Anthony M. Dean is an American engineer and currently at Colorado School of Mines, formerly holding the W. K. Coors Distinguished Professorship.  He graduated from Harvard University and Spring Hill College.

References

Year of birth missing (living people)
Living people
Colorado School of Mines faculty
21st-century American engineers
Harvard College alumni
Harvard Graduate School of Arts and Sciences alumni
Spring Hill College alumni